Melinda Raissa Hennaoui (born March 18, 1990 in Bouïra) is an Algerian female volleyball player. She was part of the Algeria women's national volleyball team.

Club information
Current club :  Istres volleyball 
Debut club :  Lyon volleyball

References

External links
 Profile at FIVB.org

1990 births
Living people
Place of birth missing (living people)
People from Bouïra
Algerian women's volleyball players
Volleyball players at the 2008 Summer Olympics
Olympic volleyball players of Algeria
Algerian expatriates in France
Wing spikers
Expatriate volleyball players in France
21st-century Algerian people